The discography of Knuckle Puck, an American rock band, consists of three studio albums, one compilation album, six extended plays, three singles, and one other release.

Studio albums

Extended plays

Compilation albums

Singles

Others

Original multi-artist compilation appearances

Music videos

See also
 List of songs recorded by Knuckle Puck

References
 Footnotes

 Citations

Discographies of American artists
Pop punk group discographies